Bronwen Thomas (born 17 March 1969) is a Canadian freestyle skier. She was born in Richmond, British Columbia. She competed at the 1992 Winter Olympics in Albertville, and at 1994 Winter Olympics in Lillehammer, where she placed 9th in women's moguls.

References

External links

1969 births
Living people
Sportspeople from British Columbia
Canadian female freestyle skiers
Freestyle skiers at the 1992 Winter Olympics
Freestyle skiers at the 1994 Winter Olympics
Olympic freestyle skiers of Canada